Richard Melvill Beachcroft (1846 – January 1926) was a British politician and mountain climber.

Beachcroft grew up in Hampstead.  He was educated at Harrow School and became a solicitor in 1868.  He later served as solicitor to Christ's Hospital. He was elected at the 1889 London County Council election, joining the Moderate group on the new council. From 1892 to 1898, he was instead an alderman on the council, and he served as deputy chairman in 1896, vice chairman in 1897, and chairman in 1909/10.  

The Moderate group was superseded by the Conservative Party group, of which Beachcroft was recognised as leader for a time around the 1904 London County Council election.  From 1903 to 1908, he also served as the founding chairman of the Metropolitan Water Board.  In 1904, he was knighted.

In his spare time, Beachcroft was an early Alpinist. He first travelled to the Alps in 1864 with Douglas Freshfield, and, in 1877, he climbed the Matterhorn. He was also active in the Alpine Club, and served on its committee from 1889 to 1891.  In addition, he served as Master of the Clothworkers' Company in 1913/14.

References

1846 births
1926 deaths
British mountain climbers
Conservative Party (UK) councillors
Knights Bachelor
Members of London County Council
People from Hampstead